Covert usually describes events carried out in secrecy.

Covert may also refer to:

Places

United States
 Covert, Kansas, an unincorporated community
 Covert, New York, a town
 Covert (hamlet), New York, within the town
 Covert Township, Michigan

Antarctica
 Covert Glacier, Victoria Land

People
 Covert (surname)
 Covert Bailey (born 1931), American retired author, television personality and lecturer on fitness and diet

Other uses
 Covert (automobile), an automobile built in the United States of America from 1901 to 1907
 Covert feather, a type of feather
 Covert (linguistics), a linguistic classification
 Covert magazine, an Indian political magazine
 Covert, a type of twill textile weave

See also
 Covert coat, a type of men's overcoat made of covert cloth
 Reid v. Covert, a landmark United States Supreme Court decision